Koréra Koré is a small town and rural commune in the Cercle of Nioro in the Kayes Region of western Mali.

References

Communes of Kayes Region